Benjamin Anthony DiNucci (born November 24, 1996), is an American football quarterback for the Seattle Sea Dragons of the XFL. He played college football at James Madison and was drafted by the Dallas Cowboys of the National Football League (NFL) in the seventh round of the 2020 NFL Draft.

Early years
DiNucci attended Pine-Richland High School in Gibsonia, Pennsylvania, where he played high school football. As a sophomore, he became a starter at quarterback. 

As a senior, he threw for a WPIAL-record 4,269 yards becoming the first player in Pennsylvania history to throw for over 4,000 yards in a season with 46 touchdowns and 9 interceptions. He led his team to a 15–1 record, and a state AAAA championship game appearance. He received 2014–2015 Gatorade Player of the Year for the state of Pennsylvania, second-team USA TODAY All-American, Pennsylvania Sports Writers Class AAAA Player of the Year, Pennsylvania Football News Class AAAA Offensive Player of the Year honors.
 
DiNucci finished his high school career with 548 of 809 completions for 7,619 yards, and 72 touchdowns.

College career
Although he originally intended to enroll at the University of Pennsylvania, DiNucci decomitted and accepted a football scholarship from the University of Pittsburgh, after Pat Narduzzi was hired as the new head coach.

As a redshirt freshman, he was a backup quarterback behind Nathan Peterman. His first game experience came in the final offensive series against Duke University. In the 2016 Pinstripe Bowl, he relieved an injured Peterman late in the third quarter, posting three of nine completions for 16 yards, one touchdown, two interceptions and two carries for 18 yards in a 31–24 loss against Northwestern University.

As a sophomore, he was named the starting quarterback before the seventh game against North Carolina State University, after senior Max Browne suffered a season-ending right shoulder injury. He was platooned during the year and eventually lost the starting position to true freshman Kenny Pickett, for the season finale 24–14 victory against the previously undefeated No. 2 University of Miami. He finished with 88 of 158 completions for 1,091 yards, five touchdowns and five interceptions. In December, he announced his decision to transfer to James Madison University.

As a junior at James Madison, he started all 13 games at quarterback, posting 211 of 309 completions for 2,275 yards, 16 passing touchdowns, 12 interceptions, 433 rushing yards and nine rushing touchdowns (leading the team). He received third-team All-CAA honors. He had a career-high 316 passing yards against Elon University. He passed for a career-best four touchdowns against the University of Rhode Island. He rushed for career highs of 104 rushing yards and three rushing touchdowns at Towson University.

As a senior, he started all 16 games at quarterback, passing for 3,441 yards, 29 passing touchdowns, completed nearly 71% of his throws, had 122 carries for 569 yards and seven rushing touchdowns. He earned All-CAA, CAA Offensive Player of the Year and AFCA first-team All-American honors. He led the Dukes to the FCS Championship Game, where the team lost to North Dakota State University. In the title game, DiNucci completed 22 of 33 passes for 204 yards, two touchdowns and one interception.

He finished his career at James Madison ranked third in completions (479), fourth in passing touchdowns (45) and passing yards (5,716) and seventh in total offense (6,718).

Professional career

Dallas Cowboys
DiNucci was selected by the Dallas Cowboys in the seventh round with the 231st overall pick in the 2020 NFL Draft, after it became apparent that he was considering signing with either the Cleveland Browns or the Chicago Bears if he were to become an undrafted free agent.  On October 19, 2020, DiNucci made his NFL debut in relief of Andy Dalton against the Arizona Cardinals. On October 25, 2020, against the Washington Football Team, DiNucci came into the game after Dalton left the game with a concussion. DiNucci threw his first completed pass, for 32 yards, to Amari Cooper. The Cowboys lost 25–3.

On October 31, 2020, the Cowboys announced that DiNucci would make his first career start on Sunday Night Football against the Philadelphia Eagles due to Dalton being in concussion protocol. In the game, DiNucci completed 21-of-40 passes for 180 yards, lost two fumbles and was sacked 4 times, as the Cowboys lost 23–9. Dinucci was passed on the depth chart by Garrett Gilbert for the backup job in the following games.

On August 31, 2021, DiNucci was waived by the Cowboys and added to the practice squad. He signed a reserve/future contract with the Cowboys on January 18, 2022.

On August 30, 2022, DiNucci was waived by the Cowboys.

Seattle Sea Dragons
DiNucci was allocated in the opening phase of the 2023 XFL Draft. Outside of A.J. McCarron, DiNucci is the only quarterback in the draft pool to have had NFL regular season experience.
On November 15, 2022, DiNucci was selected by the XFL's Seattle Sea Dragons.

NFL career statistics

Spring league career statistics

References

External links
Dallas Cowboys bio
James Madison Dukes bio
Pitt Panthers bio

1996 births
Living people
Players of American football from Atlanta
Players of American football from Pennsylvania
Sportspeople from the Pittsburgh metropolitan area
People from Allegheny County, Pennsylvania
American football quarterbacks
Pine-Richland High School alumni
Pittsburgh Panthers football players
James Madison Dukes football players
Dallas Cowboys players
Seattle Sea Dragons players